DnaJ homolog subfamily B member 9 is a protein that in humans is encoded by the DNAJB9 gene.

References

Further reading

Heat shock proteins